Francisco Jaílson de Sousa (born November 29, 1986, in Itapipoca), or simply Jajá, is a Brazilian attacking midfielder. He is currently plays for Jiangxi Liansheng in the China League One.

Career History
On 2005, Jaja started his senior football career in Bahia. On 2006, when he joined Cruzeiro on a 6-year contract. On 2008, he played 17 matches for Cruzeiro, however he could not have a good performance. Between 2006 and 2012, he played on loan in many Brazilian football clubs in Série B and Série C of Brazilian football league. On 2009, he also played for a short time in Montedio Yamagata in J1 League in Japan. In January 2013, he joined Guarani-MG, a football club competing in Série D.

In July 2014, he joined Atlético CP in Portugal.

Honours
Cruzeiro
Campeonato Mineiro: 2008

Vitória
Campeonato Baiano: 2009

Boa Esporte
Taça Minas Gerais: 2012

References

External links
 
 
 Guardian.uk statistics
 
 
 Jajá at ZeroZero

1986 births
Living people
Brazilian footballers
Esporte Clube Bahia players
Cruzeiro Esporte Clube players
Ipatinga Futebol Clube players
Associação Desportiva Cabofriense players
Clube Náutico Capibaribe players
Vila Nova Futebol Clube players
Sociedade Esportiva e Recreativa Caxias do Sul players
Montedio Yamagata players
Horizonte Futebol Clube players
Campeonato Brasileiro Série B players
J1 League players
Expatriate footballers in Japan
Atlético Clube de Portugal players
Liga Portugal 2 players
China League One players
Jiangxi Beidamen F.C. players
Expatriate footballers in China
Brazilian expatriate sportspeople in China
Brazilian expatriate footballers
Expatriate footballers in Portugal
Brazilian expatriate sportspeople in Portugal
Association football midfielders
Sportspeople from Ceará